Tanel Leok (born 1 June 1985) is an Estonian professional motocross racer. He has competed in the Motocross World Championships since 2001.

Early life
Tanel was born in Võru, Estonia and currently resides in Balen, Belgium. His father, Arvo Leok, was a motocross rider and introduced his son to the sport at a young age. He lived in Estonia and attended Sõmerpalu Primary school until he was 16 years old when he decided to pursue his racing career full-time.

Career

Early career
He became the first rider with two junior world titles to his credit, winning the 85 cc FIM world cup in 2000 and the 125cc FIM Junior World Cup in 2001. He turned semi-professional midway through the 2001 season, and qualified for a number of GP races at 15 years of age. He claimed his first senior title in 2001 as well, being crowned German 125cc champion. His hard-charging and unmistakable racing style earned him the moniker "The Estonian Express."

2002–2003: KTM
In 2002 his first professional team was Vangani Racing KTM His teammates were Tyla Rattray and Ben Townley. In 2003, the Vangani Racing team metamorphosed into Bruforce Racing, still on KTM motorcycles. Tanel had by now definitely broken through in the top level of motocross world.

2004: Suzuki
After a few successful races in the 125cc class in 2003,  he successfully shifted to 250 cc class for the Motovision Racing Suzuki team in 2004. He made a huge impact during this season, being the only remaining top level rider on a two-stroke machine in the class. His reputation was solidified with a number of furious on-track battles with the hotshots of the class, such as multiple world champion Stefan Everts.

2005–2008: Kawasaki

At the end of the  2004 season he signed a two-year contract with the Kawasaki factory team of legendary champion maker  Jan De Groot. Leok claimed his first podium in FIM Motocross World Championships MX1 class on 2 April 2006 at Zolder, Belgium.   This contract was renewed for another two-year term at the end of the 2006 racing season. After having claimed numerous GP podiums in the preceding year, Tanel Leok won his first MX1 Grand Prix in Ireland in 31, August 2008. He claimed 9 podiums and 1449 points with kawasaki team.

2009: Yamaha

At the end of the 2008 Season, Red Bull Yamaha De Carli announced that they will move on to MX1-GP in the 2009 season and the riders will be Antonio Cairoli and Tanel Leok. The 2009 season started off well for the Estonian, winning the Italian MX1 motocross championships by a margin of 5 points over Cairoli (158–153). He won the first GP of the season in Faenza, Italy, and was the first holder of the red plate marking him as world championship leader. 2009 year was steady season for Leok, only 2 retirements: 1st race in Latvia and 2nd race in Brazil.

2010: Honda
Tanel signed with Honda on September 27, 2009 and in 2010 season he is in LS Motors Honda team, his teammate is Davide Guarneri.
In his first season with LS Motors Honda team Tanel chose his "legendary" riding number 40, he started riding in MX1 class with this number in 2004. In addition he got his first personal driving trainer – Marnicq Bervoets, this is very important renewal for Leok. His first competition with Honda was on February 7, 2010 in the Mantua Starcross. He had good starts, placed 3rd in second race and 1st in third race, overall place was 6th, because he retired first race. Tanel Leok finished 2nd to Guarneri in Italian MX1 motocross championships. Leok lost the championship by 17 points (152–135). On May 16, 2010 Leok won the second race and was the overall winner in the Grand Prix of Catalunya.

2011: TM
In September 2010 Tanel signed with TM Racing Factory Team. His first competition with TM was on February 19–20, 2011 in Mantova Starcross. Leok finished second in all three races and were also second overall behind David Philippaerts. The 2011 season was poor season for Tanel, he had several crashes and technical problems with bike.  The best moment of this season was holeshot win in the Grand Prix of Czech Republic and the worst moment was the crash in the Grand Prix of Great Britain.

2012: Suzuki
In October 2011 Tanel signed with Rockstar Energy Suzuki World MX1 team, this is Suzuki factory team. His teammate in 2012 season was Clement Desalle. On February 5, 2012 Tanel Leok battled snow and icy conditions to race to second place overall against 1080 riders at Enduropale Du Touquet Beach Race in northern France, less than two minutes behind overall winner Jean-Claude Mousse. Leok best race in 2012 season was in Benelux GP where he got his only podium in this season.

2013: Honda and TM

In September 2012 Tanel signed for British motocross team Route77energy MVR-D Honda. His teammate in 2013 season was Jason Dougan. On 2 June, Tanel crashed heavily and broke his collarbone, causing him two miss two races. At the end of the month, Route77 Honda withdrew from the World Motocross Championship due to financial problems. Prior to the Swedish Grand Prix, Leok rejoined the TM Racing Factory Team.

2014: TM

In November 2013 Tanel re-signed for Italian motocross team TM Ricci Racing. His teammate in 2014 season was Davide Guarneri. TM Ricci Racing rider Tanel Leok hasn’t had the best of starts to the season. With a knee injury he picked up in the off-season.

2015: Kawasaki

The Estonian Express, Tanel Leok, has signed an agreement with the British-based LPE Kawasaki Team for next year. After a long time in the Grand Prix's, Leok will focus himself on the British MX1 Championship and the MX Nationals in Great Britain. Tanel had a good season racing the British Championship and finished second in the championship under the LPE Kawasaki.

2016–2021: Husqvarna

Tanel Leok has once again inked a deal to join up with the MVR-D team for the third time in his career. His team clearly kept in good terms and Tanel will now be racing the British championship for them in 2016 – the team have decided to run Husqvarna’s in 2016 switching from the Honda machine.

In September 2016 Tanel signed with 8Biano Husqvarna racing team. His teammate in 2017 season was Rui Goncalves.

Leok, a former factory rider, turned 2018 season privateer and team manager of his own A1 Motorsport Husqvarna team.

Tanel Leok has the world record of the most Motocross of Nations performances, he has 19 straight years and 19 times in the final. Achievied his 19th race in 2019 Motocross des Nations

The A1 Motorsports Husqvarna privateer lined-up during 2020 season the second race here in Kegums, making it his 500th Grand Prix race attendance of his professional racing career, an incredible achievement for the Estonian rider.
Estonian professional motocross racer Tanel Leok announced on 3 November 2020 that, the Kegums round in Latvia next year will be the last of his 20-year career.

Career summary

Complete World Championship Results

Personal life
Leok married Karoliina Karu on 11 October 2008. They have three sons, Sebastian (born 3 December 2007), Travis Leok (born 14 April 2010) and Leon Leok (born 14 March 2015). His cousin Aigar Leok is also a motocross racer.

References

External links

 Tanel Leok  – Official site
 Tanel Leok Profile  – Official Team site

1985 births
Living people
Sportspeople from Võru
Estonian motocross riders